KLT may refer to:

Kalmar Länstrafik, a regional transportation authority of Kalmar County, Sweden.
Kanade–Lucas–Tomasi Feature Tracker, a computer vision algorithm
Karhunen–Loève transform, a mathematical procedure
kawamata log terminal, a type of singularity in algebraic geometry
Kernel-level thread
Kernev, Leon and Treger, the Breton names for Cornouaille, Leon and Trégor
Kleinladungsträger, German name to indicate Euro container
Kids Learning Tube, an American educational web series created by Matthew Lawrence